Time of useful consciousness (TUC), also effective performance time (EPT), is defined as the amount of time an individual is able to function effectively (e.g. perform flying duties) in an environment of inadequate oxygen supply. It is the period of time from the interruption of the oxygen supply or exposure to an oxygen-poor environment to the time when useful function is lost, and the individual is no longer capable of taking proper corrective and protective action. It is not the time to total unconsciousness. At the higher altitudes, the TUC becomes very short; considering this danger, the emphasis is on prevention rather than cure.

For orbital altitudes and above, that is, direct exposure to space, 6–9 seconds of consciousness is expected.

Medical analysis and variations 
There are many individual variations of hypoxia, even within the same person. Generally, old age tends to reduce the efficiency of the pulmonary system, and can cause the onset of hypoxia symptoms sooner. Hypoxia can be produced in a hypobaric chamber. This can be useful for identifying individual symptoms of hypoxia, along with rough estimates of the altitude that causes problems for each person. Identifying symptoms is often helpful for self-diagnosis in order to realize when altitude should be reduced.

The table below shows average TUCs as documented by the Federal Aviation Administration; a rapid ascent results in a lower TUC. The TUCs for any given individual may differ significantly from this. Aerobic exercise during the TUC period will reduce the TUCs considerably; so will exercise immediately prior to the TUC as this induces an oxygen debt prior to exposure.

See also 
 Armstrong limit maximum survivable altitude
 Cabin pressurization
 Pressure suit
 Uncontrolled decompression

References 

Aviation medicine
Pulmonology
Aviation accidents and incidents